Antonino Alessio Palumbo (born 8 September 1985) is an Italian motorcycle racer. He has competed at international level in the 250cc World Championship and the Supersport World Championship; at national level he won the Coppa Italia 125 SP in 2004 and the Coppa Italia Stock 600 in 2008.

Career statistics

Grand Prix motorcycle racing

By season

Races by year
(key)

Supersport World Championship

Races by year
(key)

References

External links
 

1985 births
Sportspeople from Catania
Living people
Italian motorcycle racers
250cc World Championship riders
Supersport World Championship riders